The Minister of State for European Affairs is a junior ministerial post at the Department of the Taoiseach and the Department of Foreign Affairs of the Government of Ireland with special responsibility for European Affairs. The Minister works with the Taoiseach and the  Minister for Foreign Affairs. The Minister of State does not hold cabinet rank.

The current officeholder is Peter Burke, TD, who took up the post in December 2022.

List of Ministers of State

See also
Minister for European Affairs – a similar position in other governments.

References

Europe
Ministers and ministries responsible for European affairs
1994 establishments in Ireland
Department of Foreign Affairs (Ireland)